Thodisi Bewafaii is a 1980 Hindi movie written and directed by Esmayeel Shroff. The film stars Rajesh Khanna, Shabana Azmi and Padmini Kohlapure. The music is by Khayyam.The film was a commercial hit and in some cities celebrated as a golden jubilee.

Plot
Arvind Kumar Choudhary is an elderly, wealthy businessman whose wife is dead and who lives in a palatial mansion with his only son, Arun (Rajesh Khanna). He remarries with another woman, Sujata, a widow with two daughters, Veena and Seema. Arun assumes that the new woman in his father's life is a floozy and a gold-digger. He does not respect his new step-mother and refuses to even speak with her. Arun meets Neema Deshmukh (Shabana Azmi) and they fall in love with each other. With the approval of their respective families, they get married.

At work one day, Arun accidentally breaks a valuable diamond while daydreaming about Neema. He and his father are required to pay for the loss of value, and as a result, the Choudharys lose all their savings, building, vehicles and property. They are compelled to move to a shanty apartment. Arvind passes away from the trauma of seeing his life's work destroyed. Arun takes over the reins of this family, and it is necessary for him to interact with his stepmother to settle various legal matters. He finds that she is a noble, forgiving lady with a generous heart and he develops respect for her. Around this time, Neema gives birth to a baby boy and they name him Abhinandan.

Misunderstandings occur between Sujata and Neema, they escalate, fueled by some gossip from neighboring women, leading to arguments between Neema and Arun (who is now reconciled with his step-mother and takes her side). One day, Neema's brother Mahendra sees Arun with another woman. This is Dr. Karuna, a family friend who has no interest in Arun or vice versa. Mahendra informs his sister, who packs her things, picks up her son in her arms and simply walks out of the house without making any effort to ascertain the facts. She goes back to her father's house to live with him and Mahendra. She then approaches the courts and secures custody of Abhinandan. The situation is that Arun is only allowed one brief visit a week, at 4 PM every Sunday. Arun, who is completely innocent of the charge of adultery, is extremely unhappy with this humiliation, especially after Neema makes problems and nuisance even during the few minutes every week when he is allowed to meet his son. He decides to wait until his son is 14 and then take him home.

Neema's father is arrested by the Anti-Corruption Bureau while accepting a huge bribe from a businessman named Lalwani. This results in huge public humiliation for the family and many doors are closed in their faces. Mahendra asks Neema to sell her jewellery and provide him with funds so that he can immigrate to Germany. She does what he wishes, with the result that he leaves for Germany, never to be heard from again. Neema takes her son Abhinandan and relocates to Nashik to live with her second brother Narendra and his wife. This is where Abhinandan grows up, always curious to know about his dad.

Years later, Arun, with hard work, has recovered his fortune and has become a rich and successful businessman. On Abhinandan's fourteenth birthday, Arun shows up on Neema's doorstep - only to be told that their son has run away from home. An enraged Arun must now find whether Neema is telling the truth or whether she is hiding their son someplace else. Actually, Neema is telling the truth. Only a few days previously, after some humiliating incident at school, Abhinandan had run away from home and made his way to the big city, Mumbai. In fact, he had coincidentally bumped into his father on the street and sought directions from him, with neither of them recognizing the other. He happens to get sick just outside the house of Dr. Karuna, who is a friend of Arun's family. She treats him and finds out that he is Arun's son. She immediately calls Arun to meet him. Arun flies to his son's bedside and the two are united with each other. Abhinandan returns to see his mother and gives her the news that he has found his father. She becomes a bit interested in Arun's whereabouts. However, Arun does not want to meet her or be reconciled with her because of the bitterness of the past.

Abhinandan (known affectionately as "Nandu") gets over his issues concerning paternity and develops into a healthy, college-going young man. In college, he falls in love with (Padmini Kolhapure), who is his classmate. Out on an excursion with friends one day, the two ride on a bike and sing a song. While they are enjoying this beautiful time, they are hit by a truck and Nandu is admitted to hospital. Both of his parents rush to his bedside and in this situation, Arun and Neema meet each other again. They resolve their differences and Neema accepts that she was very wrong with her suspicious, vengeful, adamant attitude. Abhinandan undergoes the required operation successfully with Neema and Arun on either side of his bed. At this point, Abhinandan asks his parents to come together. They implicitly give consent, and thus the family is united again.

Cast

Soundtrack
The music is composed by the legendary composer  Khayyam. The lyrics are penned by Gulzar.

Awards

 28th Filmfare Awards:

Won

 Best Lyricist – Gulzar for "Hazaar Rahein Mudke Dekhi"
 Best Male Playback Singer – Kishore Kumar for "Hazaar Rahein Mudke Dekhi"

Nominated

 Best Film – Konark Kombine International
 Best Director – Esmayeel Shroff
 Best Actor – Rajesh Khanna
 Best Actress – Shabana Azmi
 Best Comedian – Deven Verma
 Best Music Director – Khayyam
 Best Story – Esmayeel Shroff

References

External links

1980 films
Indian romantic drama films
Indian family films
1980 romantic drama films
1980s Hindi-language films
Films scored by Khayyam